William Henry Bateman Hope (28 March 1865-December 1919) was a British Liberal Party politician.

Background
He was born in 1865, a son of William Carey Hope of Bath, Somerset. He was educated at Eton before moving on to Trinity College, Cambridge in 1884. He received a BA in 1887. In 1890 he married Agnes Stothert of Bath.

In 1892 he bought Eastwood Manor in East Harptree. He extended the house and had electrical wiring installed making it one of the first in the county of Somerset to have electric lights.

Career
He was admitted to the Inner Temple in 1887. He was Called to the Bar in 1891. He practised on the Western Circuit. He served as a Justice of the Peace in Somerset. He was elected to Somerset County Council in 1898. He contested Somerset North at the General Election of 1900 but did not win. He was elected at the 1906 General Election when he gained North Somerset from the Conservative. He sat for one full term before retiring ahead of the next General Election in January 1910. He was Recorder of Wells from 1907 to 1915. He stood down from Somerset County Council in 1914 after 16 years service. He died in 1919 aged 54.

Sources
Liberal Yearbook 1908
British parliamentary election results 1885–1918, Craig, F. W. S.

References

External links 
Alumni Cantabrigienses: A Biographical List of All Known Students

1865 births
1919 deaths
People educated at Eton College
Liberal Party (UK) MPs for English constituencies
UK MPs 1906–1910